Benabaye is a barangay in the town of Merida in the province of Leyte. Before it became a barangay it is first a sitio of a greater barangay of Calunangan with the name of San Juan.

History

Benabaye was created due to a water that cannot reach to sitio San Juan from Calunangan. The people of sitio San Juan complain about it resulting their petition to make San Juan a barangay. The people then change the name of San Juan to Benabaye. The first Barangay Captain is Jose Orge which serve from the start of the creation of barangay until the People Power Revolution. Then when the People Revolution  revolutionists came into power the seat of the Barangay Captain were vacant. A man named Agapito Gumba a friend of the town of Merida mayor was task to serve as Officer in Charge until the next election will happen.

Barangay Captains

 Jose Orge 

 Agapito Gumba Sr. OIC (1986-1989)

 Berlito Sanchez

 Mario Ignacio (2001-2007)

 Venerando Gumba (2007-2013)

 Maria Lee Ablen (2013-   )

Municipalities of Leyte (province)